Harold Morse (born 1860) was an English international footballer, who played as a left back.

Career
Born in Birmingham, Morse started out playing rugby for Derby Wanderers. He then moved to football and played for Notts County and Notts Rangers. In 1879, he made his solitary appearance for England against Scotland. England won the game 5–4.

He later migrated to the US and settled in New Jersey. His date of death is unknown.

References

1860 births
Year of death missing
English footballers
England international footballers
Notts County F.C. players
English Football League players
Association football defenders